The Sinda District is a district of Zambia, located in the Eastern Province. It was created in 2012 by taking part of Petauke District and part of Katete District. It consists of two constituencies, namely Sinda and Kapoche.

References

Districts of Eastern Province, Zambia